Garcz  (Kashubian: Gôrcz).

For details of the history of the region, see History of Pomerania.

The village has a population of 801.

References

Garcz